The Ladima Foundation, founded in 2017, is a pan-African non-profit organization aiming to promote women in the TV and film industry. It is based in Cape Town.

The Ladima Foundation was co-founded by Lara Utian-Preston and Edima Otuokon. In 2018 it launched the A-List, a database of women professionals working in the industry across Africa. In 2019 the Foundation announced their advisory board, comprising Biola Alabi, Themba Bhebhe, Catherine Gitahi, Bikiya Graham-Douglas, Charlotte Giese, Nse Ikpe-Etim, Fibby Kioria, Elias Ribeiro, Monica Rorvik and Debra Zimmerman.

References

External links
 Ladime Foundation website

Mass media in Africa
Television organizations based in Africa
Women's film organizations
Organizations established in 2017
2017 establishments in Africa